Rejowiec may refer to the following places:
Rejowiec, Greater Poland Voivodeship (west-central Poland)
Rejowiec, Lublin Voivodeship (east Poland)
Rejowiec, Świętokrzyskie Voivodeship (south-central Poland)
Rejowiec Fabryczny, Lublin Voivodeship (east Poland)
Gmina Rejowiec an administrative district in Lublin Voivodeship (east Poland)
Gmina Rejowiec Fabryczny an administrative district in Lublin Voivodeship (east Poland)